Conospermum patens, commonly known as the slender smokebush,  is a plant of the family proteaceae native to Victoria.

References

External links

patens